Nenad Kljaić (born 21 December 1966) is a Croatian former handball player and current coach of Greek club Olympiacos S.F. Piraeus.

Career

Kljaić won two European Champions Cups as a player with RK Zagreb in 1992 and 1993. He also won the EHF Challenge Cup in 2000 with TV Grosswallstadt.

Kljaić played for the Croatian national team from 1991 to 2001. He was part of the Croatian team that won gold medal at the 1996 Summer Olympics in Atlanta. He played six games and scored five goals.

After retiring from competitions he worked with RK Croatia Osiguranje Zagreb.

Personal life
He is the son of Velimir Kljaić and Jasenka Kljaić, born Neralić.
He was married to Sandra Mejovšek-Kljaić. Together they have a son and daughter.

Kljaić speaks Croatian, English and German.

Honours

Player
Medveščak Zagreb
Yugoslav Cup: 1986, 1987

RK Zagreb
Croatian First League: 1991–92, 1992–93, 1993–94, 2000–01
Croatian Cup: 1992, 1993, 1994
Yugoslav First League: 1988–89, 1990–91
Yugoslav Cup: 1991
European Champions Cup: 1992, 1993
EHF Super Cup: 1993

TV Grosswallstadt
EHF Challenge Cup: 2000

RK Metković Jambo
Croatian Cup: 2002

Yugoslavia
1990 World Championship Czechoslovakia - 4th place
1990 Goodwill Games Seattle - 2nd place

Croatia
1993 Mediterranean Games Languedoc-Roussillon - 1st place
1994 European Championship Portugal - 3rd place
1996 Summer Olympics Atlanta - 1st place
1997 World Championship Japan - 13th place
1999 World Championship Egypt - 10th place
1999 Super Cup Germany - 2nd place
2000 European Championship Croatia - 6th place
2001 World Championship France - 9th place

Individual
Franjo Bučar State Award for Sport - 1992, 1994

As coach
Croatia Osiguranje Zagreb
Croatian First/Premier League: 2006--07, 2010-11
Croatian Cup: 2007, 2011

Saudi Arabia
2013 World Championship Spain - 19th place
2014 Asian Championship Bahrain - 6th place
2015 World Championship Qatar - 22nd place
2016 Asian Championship Bahrain - 4th place

Al-Rayan SC
AHF Champions League Finalist: 2013

Orders
 Order of Danica Hrvatska with face of Franjo Bučar – 1995

References

External links

 European competition
 Head coach of Olympiacos Piraeus from Feb. 2020 www.olympiacossfp.gr 
 
 
 
 

1966 births
Living people
Croatian male handball players
Olympic handball players of Croatia
Handball players at the 1996 Summer Olympics
Olympic gold medalists for Croatia
Olympic medalists in handball
RK Medveščak Zagreb players
RK Zagreb players
Croatian handball coaches
Medalists at the 1996 Summer Olympics
Mediterranean Games gold medalists for Croatia
Competitors at the 1993 Mediterranean Games
Croatian expatriate sportspeople in Germany
Croatian expatriate sportspeople in Qatar
Croatian expatriate sportspeople in Saudi Arabia
Handball players from Zagreb
Mediterranean Games medalists in handball
Goodwill Games medalists in handball
Competitors at the 1990 Goodwill Games